Amadense Esporte Clube, commonly known as Amadense, is a Brazilian football club based in Tobias Barreto, Sergipe state.

History
The club was founded on August 23, 1981, in Nossa Senhora da Glória, moving to Tobias Barreto city in 2005. They finished in the second position in the Campeonato Sergipano Série A2 in 2005, when they lost the competition to Olímpico de Pirambu.

Stadium
Amadense Esporte Clube play their home games at Estádio Antônio Brejeiro, nicknamed Brejeirão. The stadium has a maximum capacity of 4,000 people.

References

Association football clubs established in 1981
Football clubs in Sergipe
1981 establishments in Brazil